Crackie is a 2009 Canadian drama film written and directed by Sherry White. It stars Meghan Greeley, Mary Walsh, Joel Thomas Hynes and Cheryl Wells, and is White's first feature film.

Plot
Mitsy (Greeley) is a teenage student who lives with her grandmother, Bride (Walsh) after having been left at an early age by her mother (Wells). Mitsy secretly dreams of leaving her small town to live with her mother in Alberta but finds her life disrupted when her mother suddenly reappears.

Cast

Release
Crackie was an official selection at film festivals including the Karlovy Vary International Film Festival in the Czech Republic, the Toronto International Film Festival, the Montreal World Film Festival and the Torino Film Festival in Turin. It won the Grand Prix Focus — Special Mention at Montreal, and the Jury Special Prize at Torino.

References

External links
 

2009 films
2009 drama films
Canadian drama films
English-language Canadian films
2000s English-language films
2000s Canadian films